The Nordic Centre in Shanghai at Fudan University (复旦大学北欧中心) was officially opened on November 8, 1995 by the Norwegian Prime Minister Gro Harlem Brundtland and Professor Yang Fujia, President of Fudan University.  The Nordic Centre was then a joint project between Fudan University and 14 Nordic universities.  Today the Centre has 26 member universities representing the five Nordic countries and one associate member.

The Nordic Centre is the only joint Nordic academic institution set up in China.

Member Universities

China
Fudan University

Denmark
Aalborg University
Copenhagen Business School
University of Aarhus
University of Copenhagen
University of Southern Denmark

Finland
Aalto University
Hanken School of Economics
Lappeenranta University of Technology
University of Eastern Finland
University of Helsinki
University of Tampere
University of Turku

Iceland
University of Iceland

Norway
Norwegian School of Economics and Business Administration
BI Norwegian Business School
Norwegian University of Science and Technology
University of Bergen
University of Oslo

Sweden
University of Gothenburg
Karolinska Institutet
Lund University
Royal Institute of Technology
Stockholm University
Umeå University
Uppsala University
Linköping University

Associate Member
Nordic Institute of Asian Studies

External links
 Nordic Centre in Shanghai

 

Fudan University
Nordic organizations
European studies
Scandinavian studies
Educational organizations based in China